Rybnye Borki is a rural locality (a settlement) in Bayevsky District, Altai Krai, Russia. The population was 57 as of 2013. There are 3 streets.

Geography 
Rybnye Borki is located 18 km southwest of Bayevo (the district's administrative centre) by road. Nizhnechumanka is the nearest rural locality.

References 

Rural localities in Bayevsky District